Lake Bindegolly is a national park in Dynevor, Shire of Bulloo,  South West Queensland, Australia, 871 km west of Brisbane and 40 km from the town of Thargomindah.  It is in the Mulga Lands bioregion and was established to protect a population of the rare plant Acacia ammophila.  It has three lakes, two saline and one freshwater.

Birds

A 318 km2 area of the lake and its surrounds has been identified by BirdLife International as an Important Bird Area (IBA) because it has supported over 1% of the world populations of blue-billed ducks and red-necked avocets as well as populations of the biome-restricted inland dotterel, Bourke's parrot, slaty-backed thornbill, grey-headed honeyeater, black honeyeater, pied honeyeater, Hall's babbler, chirruping wedgebill and chestnut-breasted quail-thrush.

See also

 List of lakes of Australia
 Protected areas of Queensland

References

External links
 Lake Bindegolly National Park

National parks of Queensland
Protected areas established in 1991
1991 establishments in Australia
Important Bird Areas of Queensland
Bindegolly
South West Queensland